Michael 'Mickey' Thornhill (January 26, 1931 - 2018) was a male international table tennis player from England.

He competed at the 1951 World Table Tennis Championships with Ron Crayden, Brian Kennedy, Johnny Leach and Aubrey Simons and 1959 World Table Tennis Championships in the Swaythling Cup (men's team event) with Ian Harrison, Jeff Ingber, Kennedy and Leach for England.

He represented Middlesex at county level and won an English Open title. He was Junior Champion of England in 1948.

See also
 List of England players at the World Team Table Tennis Championships

References

English male table tennis players
1931 births
2018 deaths
People from Croydon